The Surfrider Foundation USA is a U.S. 501(c)(3) grassroots non-profit environmental organization that works to protect and preserve the world's oceans, waves and beaches. It focuses on water quality, beach access, beach and surf spot preservation, and sustaining marine and coastal ecosystems.

Headquartered in San Clemente, California, the Surfrider Foundation maintains a small staff, which work to support the organization's network of regional grassroots chapters. The current CEO is Chad Nelsen.

History

The Surfrider Foundation was started in Malibu, California in 1984 by a handful of surfers to protest threats to their local surf break at Malibu Point. The organization continued on for several years as a loose advocacy group until 1991, when the first chapters were founded.

Programs and campaigns
In November 2018 the Surfrider Foundation launched a campaign declaring "We are the United States and Oceans of America". The campaign sought to inform people that America is made up of more water than land and that the ocean is the responsibility of all Americans. America's oceans cover nearly 4.5 million square miles, which is about 20% greater than U.S. landmass.

Chapters
Surfrider is organized into a network of regional chapters and student clubs.

The foundation was a key plaintiff in the battle to open Martin's Beach.

Notable members and supporters
Jeff Bridges, actor
Yvon Chouinard, founder of Patagonia
Woody Harrelson, actor
Gregory Harrison actor
Mark Hoppus, musician
Bruce Johnston, musician
Jason Mraz, musician
Tristan Prettyman, musician 
Eddie Vedder, musician

References

External links

Know Your H2O program and The Cycle of Insanity Film

Environmental organizations based in California
Surfing organizations
Conservation and environmental foundations in the United States
Non-profit organizations based in California
Organizations based in San Diego County, California
San Clemente, California
Environmental organizations established in 1984
1984 establishments in California
1984 establishments in the United States
Surfing in California